"Came Back Haunted" is a single by American industrial rock band Nine Inch Nails, from their eighth studio album, Hesitation Marks. It was the band's first single after signing with Columbia Records.

Music and lyrics
The song contains layered synthesizer parts, rhythmic industrial patterns, and an electronic bassline, which are interrupted by a guitar-driven instrumental break. The song ends with a vocal outro with a chant of the song's title. Gary Graff of Billboard interpreted the song's lyrics as an "acknowledgement of Reznor's absence" and a presumable reference to his experiences in film scoring and How to Destroy Angels.

Release and promotion
The song first leaked online on Brazilian website BCharts, then spreading to other sites and radios. It was later streamed on the band's official SoundCloud account. The audio-only video was also uploaded to Nine Inch Nails' YouTube channel. A radio edit of the song was initially made available, which was edited down to 3:56 in length.

The song was featured in the soundtrack of the video game Gran Turismo 6.

Music video
The music video was released on June 28, 2013, with an epileptic seizure warning. It was directed by David Lynch, with whom Reznor collaborated on Lost Highway. The video runs for 4:17. Photographs taken by Nine Inch Nails collaborator Rob Sheridan during the shooting in Los Angeles were also released on June 27, 2013.

Personnel
Trent Reznor – vocals, guitar, bass, electronics, percussion, production
Alessandro Cortini – additional electronics
Ilan Rubin – tom drum
Atticus Ross – production
Alan Moulder – production

Charts

Weekly charts

Year-end charts

References

External links
Official website

2013 singles
2013 songs
Columbia Records singles
Electronica songs
Music videos directed by David Lynch
Nine Inch Nails songs
The Null Corporation singles
Song recordings produced by Alan Moulder
Song recordings produced by Atticus Ross
Song recordings produced by Trent Reznor
Songs written by Trent Reznor